Kashif Ali (born 7 February 1998) is an English cricketer. He made his Twenty20 debut for the Marylebone Cricket Club in the 2018 MCC Tri-Nation Series against the Netherlands on 29 July 2018. Ali has also been part of Kent County Cricket Club's academy scholar programme, and Nottinghamshire County Cricket Club's second XI. In June 2022, Ali signed for Worcestershire County Cricket Club, becoming the first person to graduate from the South Asian Cricket Academy and sign with a first-class county side. He made his first-class debut on 25 July 2022, for Worcestershire in the 2022 County Championship.

References

External links
 

1998 births
Living people
English cricketers
Bedfordshire cricketers
Marylebone Cricket Club cricketers
Worcestershire cricketers
English cricketers of the 21st century
British Asian cricketers
British sportspeople of Pakistani descent
People from Kotli District